"The Bulldog Breed" is a  short story by American writer Robert E. Howard, featuring his character Sailor Steve Costigan.

Publishing 
It was originally published in the February 1930 issue of Fight Stories.

Plot 
A Sailor Steve Costigan story. Steve Costigan is not too popular with the Old Man of the Sea Boy, so he goes ashore and takes his also in trouble bulldog Mike with him. When a Frenchman sinks a boot into Mike, well, a man who doesn’t stick up for his dog is the lowest of the low. Steve and Francois have to settle this in the ring.

The story is now in the public domain.

References

External links
 List of stories and publication details at Howard Works

Short stories by Robert E. Howard
Pulp stories
1930 short stories
Short stories about boxing
Works originally published in Fight Stories
Short stories set in Hong Kong